Aitor Sanz Martín (born 13 September 1984) is a Spanish professional footballer who plays for CD Tenerife as a central midfielder.

Club career
Sanz was born in Madrid. He spent the first six seasons of his senior career in the Segunda División B, with UD San Sebastián de los Reyes, Zamora CF and Real Unión. In 2008–09, he achieved promotion with the latter club.

Sanz played his first Segunda División match on 29 August 2009, featuring 90 minutes in a 0–1 home loss against Recreativo de Huelva. He made a further 26 appearances until the end of the campaign, being relegated as second-bottom.

Subsequently, Sanz remained in the third division after signing a one-year contract with Real Oviedo. He played 106 competitive games during his spell at the Estadio Carlos Tartiere, scoring in the 1–2 home defeat to SD Eibar in the 2013 promotion playoffs.

Sanz joined second-tier CD Tenerife in June 2013. He scored his first goal as a professional on 18 October 2014, but in a 3–2 loss at CA Osasuna. 

Having missed the entire 2018–19 due to an Achilles tendon injury, Sanz remained in the Canary Islands until his retirement, always in that league.

References

External links

1984 births
Living people
Spanish footballers
Footballers from Madrid
Association football midfielders
Segunda División players
Segunda División B players
Tercera División players
UD San Sebastián de los Reyes players
Zamora CF footballers
Real Unión footballers
Real Oviedo players
CD Tenerife players